Obianuju Catherine Udeh, professionally known as DJ Switch is a Nigerian disc jockey, songwriter and musician who emerged as the winner of the first edition of The Glo X Factor in 2013 at the age of 29. She is the last of eight children, from Udi in Enugu State, a Geology graduate from University of Port Harcourt, Rivers State and now a professional disc jockey.

Early life 
DJ Switch was born to Nigerian parents and grew up in Warri, a city in South-South Nigeria, Delta state. Her father has died, and she’s the last of eight children.

She is a Geology graduate from University of Port Harcourt, Rivers State.

Education 
DJ Switch graduated from the University of Port Harcourt Rivers state in Nigeria.

Career 
DJ Switch started her entertainment career as a disc jockey and moved on to becoming a song writer, as well as a musician. She first earned attention when her group, Da Pulse, emerged as the winner of the 2009 edition of reality music competition, Star Quest. They further went on to release a hit song titled, So Tey, which featured American rapper Busta Rhymes in the remix. 

Her career fully kicked off after she emerged the winner of the maiden and only edition of the Glo X-Factor in 2013. She was signed into a record deal with Sony Music as part of the prizes for the emergence, as the winner of the Glo X-Factor been endorsed by Peter Okoye’s P-Classic Records.

On 20 October 2020, DJ switch live streamed the aftermath of the Lekki Massacre. In the video, they attempted to remove a bullet from the leg of a man who was shot, tying a Nigerian flag around his leg.

Award 
DJ Switch Wins Nigeria's Glo X-Factor

References 

Living people
End SARS activists
Nigerian DJs
University of Port Harcourt alumni
Musicians from Warri
Year of birth missing (living people)
Nigerian women activists
Women DJs
Nigerian women musicians